Spectrum is a Canadian drama anthology television miniseries which aired on CBC Television in 1958.

Premise
This Vancouver-produced series featured various teleplays.

Scheduling
This half-hour series was broadcast Thursdays at 10:00 p.m. (Eastern time) from 5 June to 31 July 1958.

Episodes
 5 June 1958: The Window of Namko (Paul St. Pierre)
 12 June 1958: The Choice (Ernest Langford)
 19 June 1958: A Small Revolution (Paul Power)
 26 June 1958: Oh, Dream of Fair Islands (Ernest Langford)
 3 July 1958: His Place in Life (David Gray)
 10 July 1958: (pre-empted by special programme, "Memo to Champlain")
 17 July 1958: Joe Faceless (Len Peterson)
 24 July 1958: Some Days, You Have to Hit Somebody (Len Peterson)
 31 July 1958: Paradise Court (Peter Starner)

References

External links
 

CBC Television original programming
1958 Canadian television series debuts
1958 Canadian television series endings
1950s Canadian anthology television series
1950s Canadian drama television series
Black-and-white Canadian television shows